Kalam is a 2016 Tamil horror film directed by Robert Raaj. The film stars Srinivasan, Amzath Khan, and Lakshmi Priyaa in the lead roles.

Cast 
Srinivasan as Nakulan
Amzath Khan as Gautham 
Lakshmi Priyaa as Dheeksha
Pooja Ramachandran as Neela
Madhusudhan Rao as Madhan
Nassar as Magician
Kani Kusruti as Housekeeper
Rekha Suresh as Gautham's mother
Master Rahil Singhi
Baby Hiya as Dheeksha's daughter Hiya

Production 
The film was filmed in an ancient house that was an integral part of the plot. 80 percent of the film takes place in that house.

Soundtrack

Soundtrack was composed by Prakash Nikki.
"Mayam Kaana Varaiyo" - Sowmya Ramani Mahadevan
"Pudhu Pudhu" - Prakash Nikki
"Anuvai" - Shweta Mohan, Abhay Jodhpurkar

Release 
The Times of India gave the film three out of five stars and compared the film to a thin crust pizza: "In that sense, you could call Kalam a thin-crust Pizza — has everything you expect, but somehow doesn’t seem fullfilling". The Hindu wrote that "Save for the twist that makes you turn back to the screen with mild interest, Kalam is a rather uninspired horror show". Sify stated that  "Kalam is a watchable horror thriller. Not a bad way to spend an evening". Behindwoods stated that "Kalam, by no means, is a great horror movie. It’s more of a thriller than horror ". The Deccan Chronicle wrote that "One cannot help but reminded of Karthik Subburaj’s thriller Pizza as most part of the film unfolds inside a bungalow. The saving grace is the unexpected twist in the climax and kudos to Robert Raaj for maintaining the suspense factor intact till the end".

References

External links
 

2016 films
2010s Tamil-language films
Indian horror thriller films
2016 horror thriller films
2010s mystery thriller films
Indian mystery thriller films